Gordon Sherman Haight (6 February 1901 in Muskegon, Michigan – 28 December 1985 in Woodbridge, Connecticut) was an American professor of English at Yale University from 1950 to 1968. He was the author of George Eliot: A Biography and the editor of The George Eliot Letters.

"[Haight] was completely absorbed in the life and work of George Eliot and had the distinction, before he died, of being asked to speak at the dedication of her memorial in Westminster Abbey, an extraordinary recognition for an American, as I am sure you are aware!" ( from George F. Farr, Jr. Director, Division of Preservation and Access, National Endowment for the Humanities dated Mon, 27 Mar 1995)

Works

George Eliot: A Biography (New York and Oxford: Oxford University Press, 1968).
Mrs. Sigourney, The Sweet Singer of Hartford. New Haven: Yale University Press, 1930.
Adam Bede, introduction.  New York, Rinehart [1949, ©1948].

Works edited by Gordon S. Haight

The George Eliot Letters, 7 vols. (New Haven and London: Yale University Press, 1954–55)
The Mill on the Floss by George Eliot. Edited by Gordon S. Haight.
A century of George Eliot criticism edited by Gordon S. Haight.  Boston, Houghton Mifflin [1965].
George Eliot & John Chapman, with Chapman's Diaries. [Hamden, Conn.] Archon Books, 1969. [First edition published by Yale UP in 1940].
Essays and New Atlantis. by Bacon, Francis, 1561–1626. New York, Published for the Classics club by W. J. Black [1942].
Edward FitzGerald and the Rubaiyat, New York, Published for the Classics club by W. J. Black [1942].

Works about Gordon S. Haight
George Eliot-G. H. Lewes Newsletter (8) April 1986;  Memorial Issue for Gordon S. Haight (1901-1985).  Contains tributes to Gordon S. Haight by Rosemary Ashton, William Baker, Gillian Beer, David Carroll, Joseph Wiesenfarth, Hugh Witemeyer, and Terence R. Wright.
Haight, Gordon S.  Eliot's Originals and Contemporaries: Essays in Victorian Literary History & Biography''.  University of Michigan Press, 1992.  Contains and introductory biography by the editor, Hugh Witemeyer.

1901 births
1985 deaths
American academics of English literature
James Tait Black Memorial Prize recipients
20th-century American non-fiction writers
Corresponding Fellows of the British Academy